|}

The Dooley Insurance Group Champion Novice Chase is a Grade 1 National Hunt steeplechase in Ireland which is open to horses aged five years or older. It is run at Punchestown over a distance of about 3 miles and ½ furlong (3 miles and 120 yards, or ), and during its running there are seventeen fences to be jumped. The race is for novice chasers, and it is scheduled to take place each year during the Punchestown Festival in late April or early May.

The present version of the race was introduced in 2007, when it was sponsored by Ellier Developments. There had been two similar events in the preceding years – a Grade 2 race over a shorter distance (also sponsored by Ellier), and a handicap race over the same length. The new version was backed by Boylesports in 2009, and by Growise from 2010 to 2018.

The Growise Champion Novice Chase is Ireland's equivalent of the RSA Insurance Novices' Chase at Cheltenham, but no horse has won both races since 2007.

Records
Leading jockey since 2007 (5 wins):
 Davy Russell - Quito De La Roque (2011), Sir Des Champs (2012), Zabana (2016), The Storyteller (2018), Delta Work (2019)

Leading trainer since 2007 (5 wins):
 Willie Mullins - Kempes (2010), Sir Des Champs (2012), Valseur Lido (2015), Colreevy (2021),Capodanno (2022)

Winners since 2007

See also
 Horse racing in Ireland
 List of Irish National Hunt races

References

 Racing Post:

 pedigreequery.com – Ellier Developments Champion Novice Chase – Punchestown.

National Hunt races in Ireland
National Hunt chases
Punchestown Racecourse